WabiSabiLabi or WSLabi was an online marketplace selling computer exploits in an auction format. The company claimed that security researchers who disclosed vulnerabilities to software vendors would be more fairly compensated for their work by selling on the trusted platform. However, only a year after opening the marketplace, the company was considering shutting it down due to lack of paying customers. The company was considering moving to a subscription service to more adequately compensate security researchers. Customers who purchased exploits included the companies Verisign and 3Com. Founded in July 2007, a cofounder was arrested on spying charges in November of that same year.

See also
Zone-H, website defacement database also created by Roberto Preatoni
TheRealDeal

References

External links
 Archived page of wares for sale

Cyberwarfare